Meghan Linsey (born December 10, 1985) is an American singer-songwriter.  A Ponchatoula, Louisiana native, Linsey started her musical career by forming Steel Magnolia with her boyfriend of three years, Joshua Scott Jones. Before trying out for Can You Duet, Linsey was a karaoke host at a Nashville karaoke bar, called Lonnie's Western Room, which is where she met Jones. After becoming the top winner on the show, the duo signed a recording contract with Big Machine Records, and released its debut single "Keep On Lovin' You" in August 2009, which was a Top 10 hit on the U.S. Billboard Hot Country Songs chart. In March 2014, Linsey and Jones split and decided to pursue solo careers.

Music career
Linsey started her solo career by releasing a cover of OneRepublic's "Counting Stars". In 2015, Linsey was selected to audition for season 8 of The Voice, having three judges (with the exception of Blake Shelton) turn their chairs around. She chose Pharrell Williams as her coach, and was stolen by Shelton after losing in the battle rounds. She continued with Shelton as her coach throughout the season.  She finished the season coming in second place to Sawyer Fredericks from Team Pharrell. Shortly after she returned to Nashville, she released an EP titled Believer including six songs. Following the EP release, she developed a beauty brand titled "Believer by Meghan Linsey." To create this curated collection of cruelty-free products, she partnered with Previse and Modern Minerals.

In 2017, her first Pop studio album, named Bold Like a Lion, was released and contained 13 songs.

The Voice
 Studio version of performance reached the top 10 on iTunes

Discography

Albums

Extended plays

Singles

Music videos

Releases from The Voice

Albums

Singles

References

External links

1985 births
21st-century American singers
American women country singers
American country singer-songwriters
American women singer-songwriters
Country musicians from Louisiana
Living people
Musicians from New Orleans
Participants in American reality television series
The Voice (franchise) contestants
Singer-songwriters from Louisiana
People from Ponchatoula, Louisiana
21st-century American women singers